Akdeniz Airlines was a charter airline from Turkey that operated for a very small period of time during 1995.

History
Akdeniz Hava Yollari, which was the official name for Akdeniz Airlines, was founded in 1995. The airline planned to operate using the Boeing 757 but those could not be acquired so three Airbus A300B4 were used for charter operations. Services began in June 1995 and by December 1995 the airline had ceased operations and all three aircraft were returned to the lessors.

Fleet
3  Airbus A300B4-103

References

External links

  Data

Defunct airlines of Turkey
Airlines established in 1995
Airlines disestablished in 1995
Defunct charter airlines of Turkey